Beyer Blinder Belle Architects & Planners LLP (BBB) is an international architecture firm. It is based in New York City and has an additional office in Washington, DC. The firm's name is derived from the three founding partners: John H. Beyer, Richard Blinder, and John Belle (1932 - 2016). The three architects met in 1961 while working in the New York office of Victor Gruen. The trio developed a specialty in historic preservation.

In the decades since the firm was established in 1968, Beyer Blinder Belle has won three Presidential Design Awards, the Medal of Honor from the American Institute of Architects New York Chapter, and the national AIA Firm Award, as well as other awards.

In 2008, managing partner Frederick Bland was appointed as a commissioner of the New York City Landmarks Preservation Commission (LPC).  This city agency is responsible for protecting and preserving New York City's significant buildings and sites.

Notable projects

 Empire State Building, New York, NY
 Watchcase Factory, Sag Harbor, New York
 Lincoln Center Promenade, New York, NY
 Grand Central Terminal, New York, NY
 Rubin Museum of Art, New York, NY
 15–19 Fulton Street, Manhattan, 1983
 Japan Society, New York
 Brooklyn Navy Yard BLDG 92, New York, NY
 1838 Peter Augustus Jay House at the Jay Estate in Rye, New York
 Saint Paul Union Depot, St. Paul, MN
 Thurgood Marshall United States Courthouse, New York, NY
 TWA Flight Center, Queens, NY
 Red Star Line Museum, Antwerp, Belgium
 Morgan Library & Museum, New York, NY
 Domino Sugar Refinery (Brooklyn), Brooklyn, NY
 World Trade Center Planning, New York, NY
 Natick Collection, Natick, MA
Historic District of Columbia Courthouse, Washington, DC
 Budapest Exchange Palace, Budapest, Hungary
 Beacon Theatre (New York City), New York, NY
 Sports Museum of America, New York, NY
 Century Center for the Performing Arts, New York, NY
 Cooper-Hewitt National Design Museum New York, NY
 Princeton University Campus Master Plan, Princeton, NJ
 Bryant Arts Center at Denison University, Granville, OH
 Marine Air Terminal New York, NY
 High Line Maintenance & Operations Building (M&O), New York, NY
 Maryland House of Delegates Chamber, Annapolis, MD

References

 Ng, Henry. "Whose Vision of a Future City Will Prevail?" Architectural Record. February 20, 2008.

External links

Official website
Brooklyn Navy Yard Center at BLDG 92 BLDG92 Website

Preservationist architects
Architecture firms based in New York City
Companies based in Manhattan
Design companies established in 1968
1968 establishments in New York City